Latin Extended-D is a Unicode block containing Latin characters for phonetic, Mayanist, and Medieval transcription and notation systems. 89 of the characters in this block are for medieval characters proposed by the Medieval Unicode Font Initiative, many of which are representative of scribal abbreviations used in Medieval manuscript texts.

Block

History
The following Unicode-related documents record the purpose and process of defining specific characters in the Latin Extended-D block:

References 

Latin-script Unicode blocks
Unicode blocks